Justin Martin (born April 4, 1995) is a  professional lacrosse player for the Buffalo Bandits of the National Lacrosse League and the Oakville Rock of Major Series Lacrosse. Hailing from Oakville, Ontario, Martin began his junior lacrosse career in 2013 with the Junior B Oakville Buzz. In 2015, he moved up to Junior A with the Burlington Chiefs. He played collegiality at the University of Guelph, where he was named to the 2015 Canadian University Field Lacrosse Association All-Canadian team.

Martin was drafted in the second round (13th overall) by the Buffalo Bandits in the 2016 NLL Entry Draft. After his rookie season, he signed a two year extension with the club.

References

External links
NLL stats at pointstreak.com
MSL stats at pointstreak.com
Junior lacrosse stats at pointstreak.com

1995 births
Living people
Lacrosse people from Ontario
University of Guelph alumni
Buffalo Bandits players
Sportspeople from Oakville, Ontario